Bürnük may refer to the following places in Turkey:

 Bürnük, Bolu, a village in the district of Bolu, Bolu Province
 Bürnük, Mengen, a village in the district of Mengen, Bolu Province
 Bürnük, Tosya, a village